Anton Skerritt (born January 3, 1964) is a Trinidadian/Canadian former sprinter, and soccer player. As a sprinter he competed in the 1984 Summer Olympics, 1988 Summer Olympics, 1987 World Championships in Athletics, 1986 Commonwealth Games, and the 1989 Jeux de la Francophonie.

As a soccer player he played in the Canadian National Soccer League, and the Canadian Professional Soccer League. After his retirement from professional sports he became a vice principal for Vaughan Secondary School in Vaughan, Ontario.

Athletics career 
In 1982, Skerritt began playing soccer at the college level with Howard University. After a recommendation from an American national track and field team coach he switched to track and field. He was chosen to represent Trinidad & Tobago in the 1984 Summer Olympics to compete in Men's 400 metres, and the Men's 4×400 metres Relay.

In 1986, he switched his allegiance to Canada for the 1986 Commonwealth Games and won a bronze medal in the 4×400 metres relay. At the 1987 World Championships in Athletics he achieved a Canadian record of 45.62secs in the 400 metres event. He featured in the 1988 Summer Olympics, 1989 Jeux de la Francophonie, and the 1991 Pan American Games. In the Francophonie Games he won 3 medals in 400 metres, 4×100 metres relay, and 4×400 metres relay. He retired in 1992 to pursue his education in teaching.

Football career 
In 1994, he returned to professional soccer to play with St. Catharines Wolves of the Canadian National Soccer League. The following season he signed with Toronto Italia, and also had a stint in the Canadian International Soccer League with the Caribbean Stars. In 1996, he returned to St. Catharines where he won the Umbro Cup and reached the CNSL Championship finals against Toronto Italia but lost the series by a score of 11-0 on goals on aggregate.

In 1997, he signed with the Hamilton White Eagles, but was released midway through the season as the league suspended the organization for the remainder of the season. In 2002, he signed with expansion franchise the Metro Lions of the Canadian Professional Soccer League. In their debut season the Lions secured a postseason berth by finishing third in the Eastern Conference. In the semi-finals they faced the Ottawa Wizards, but suffered a 1-0 defeat.  He returned for a second season with the Lions, and helped the club reach the finals of the Open Canada Cup tournament where they lost the match to London City 4-2 on penalties.

References

External links
 
 
 
 
 
 

1964 births
Living people
Athletes (track and field) at the 1984 Summer Olympics
Athletes (track and field) at the 1988 Summer Olympics
Olympic track and field athletes of Canada
Olympic athletes of Trinidad and Tobago
Athletes (track and field) at the 1986 Commonwealth Games
Athletes (track and field) at the 1990 Commonwealth Games
Commonwealth Games silver medallists for Canada
Athletes (track and field) at the 1991 Pan American Games
Pan American Games track and field athletes for Canada
World Athletics Championships athletes for Canada
Trinidad and Tobago male sprinters
Trinidad and Tobago footballers
Canadian soccer players
Black Canadian soccer players
St. Catharines Roma Wolves players
Toronto Italia players
Canadian National Soccer League players
Brampton United players
Canadian Soccer League (1998–present) players
Commonwealth Games medallists in athletics
Trinidad and Tobago emigrants to Canada
Association football defenders
Medallists at the 1986 Commonwealth Games